Scott Andrew Speed (born January 24, 1983) is an American race car driver who has competed in numerous disciplines, including open-wheel, stock car, and rallycross racing.

He contested 28 races before he was replaced midway through the  season by Sebastian Vettel. Speed later turned his career towards stock car racing, specifically NASCAR where he drove for Team Red Bull, Whitney Motorsports and Leavine Family Racing in the Sprint Cup Series. Subsequently, he moved into Global Rallycross with Andretti Autosport, winning the title in 2015, 2016 and 2017. He won the 2018 Americas Rallycross Championship with Andretti before racing in 2019 with Subaru Rally Team USA.

Early years

Speed's career started at the age of 10 in karting, his stint there lasting from 1993 until 2001, winning the SKUSA Super Pro Title for JM Racing driving a Tony Kart Swedetech Honda in 2000 2 IKF Grand Nationals driving a 6-year-old kart, and 3 IKF regional titles. He also won the 2002 Rock Island GP in 125cc Shifter Karts. He moved up to the Formula series in 2001, competing in US Formula Russell and becoming champion. He drove in both the Formula Dodge National Championship and Star Mazda in 2002, finishing third and eighth respectively.

In 2003, Speed drove for Alan Docking Racing in the British Formula Three Championship after winning the Red Bull Driver Search programme. During that year he fell ill with ulcerative colitis, a form of inflammatory bowel disease, and was forced to return to the United States for treatment.

After returning in 2004, Speed won two championship titles, with him first winning the Formula Renault 2000 Eurocup and later the Formula Renault 2000 Germany, despite his worsening colitis. His performances resulted in a drive in the inaugural season of GP2 Series for 2005, as number two at iSport International, to Can Artam. Speed was later promoted to the first driver for the team, as he collected five podiums and 12 top 5 finishes in 24 races. He ended the season third place in the drivers' championship standings behind Nico Rosberg and Heikki Kovalainen.

At the end of 2005, Speed drove the first three races of the new A1 Grand Prix series for A1 Team USA, achieving a best result of fourth in the Portugal feature race.

Formula One

Red Bull (2005)

Toro Rosso (2006–07)

2006
A week later at the  he retired after 41 laps due to a clutch failure. After the  it looked as if he had scored his and Toro Rosso's first point. Later on, however, he had 25 seconds added to his race time for overtaking under yellow flags, dropping him to 9th place and out of the points. He was also fined $5000 for using inappropriate language towards David Coulthard during a post-race stewards hearing.

A week later and after a decent run at the  he finished 11th. Speed bounced back and ran rather well at the  finishing 10th.

At the  he qualified a career-best 13th only to be taken out in a first-lap collision. In turn 2, McLaren's Juan Pablo Montoya nudged his teammate Kimi Räikkönen into a spin. Montoya then clouted Honda's Jenson Button whose front right tyre got caught by BMW Sauber's Nick Heidfeld who was launched into a triple barrel roll. Speed was caught up in the resulting melee. None of the drivers were injured. His teammate Liuzzi finished 8th and scored the team's first World Championship point. At the  he finished 10th, matching David Coulthard's pace throughout, after suffering from back pains and breathing problems, consequences from a Friday practice accident.

At the  he finished 11th and 4 laps behind the leader in very wet and changeable conditions. At the next round in Japan, Speed started the race in 19th. Suffering a power steering failure with five laps remaining, Speed was unable to finish but was classified in 17th place. Finally, at the season-ending , Speed finished 11th of the 17 cars classified after starting down in 17th.

After much speculation, Scuderia Toro Rosso confirmed on February 24, 2007, that Speed had signed to continue driving for the team in the 2007 Formula One season. He once again teamed up with Vitantonio Liuzzi.

2007
Speed's 2007 season was largely disappointing, punctuated with poor reliability and several crashes. He had two separate collisions with Alexander Wurz at Silverstone and at Canada which put him out of the race. After the race, it was reported that he was involved in a physical altercation with team principal Franz Tost, although Tost has since denied this. Speed also went on a verbal offensive against the team, claiming that they wanted to get rid of both him and Liuzzi. Speed's future with Toro Rosso remained very much in doubt for the rest of that season. The doubts were seemingly calmed after continued testing for the team. From the pre-season through the Nurburgring, he and the team had endured constant speculation over the status of his tenure.

However, it was announced before the Hungarian Grand Prix that he had been replaced by BMW third driver Sebastian Vettel. The best result of Speed's season was 9th place at Monaco from 18th on the grid, just missing out on a championship point but finishing just ahead of the Hondas of Rubens Barrichello and Jenson Button.

On July 31, 2007, Speed was released from his contract at Scuderia Toro Rosso and replaced by BMW Sauber test driver Sebastian Vettel, who was under contract to Red Bull's driver development programme. Speed has said that no amount of money would get him to work with the Toro Rosso team bosses in the future. Nevertheless, Speed's relationship with Red Bull as a whole remained good, and he secured a Red Bull-backed drive in the U.S. for 2008.

ARCA Re/MAX Series

In preparation for his impending NASCAR career, Speed entered into the Automobile Racing Club of America (ARCA) series in selected races in 2007, and a full season in 2008. Driving the Red Bull-sponsored Toyota for Eddie Sharp Racing with teammates Ken Butler Jr & Pierre Bourque, Speed finished 5th in ARCA RE/MAX Series points in 2008. He was in prime position to win the championship, but in the final race, he was wrecked by Ricky Stenhouse Jr. who was another contender for the championship. Speed, along with car owner Sharp, earned the Hoosier Tire Superspeedway Challenge title in 2008. In 22 career starts from 2007, Speed scored 10 top-5 finishes and 18 top-10s including 4 wins at Kansas Speedway, Kentucky Speedway, Berlin Raceway and Nashville Superspeedway, all occurring in 2008. Speed was a championship contender in the 2008 season, however the season ended in controversy, and without a championship for Speed and Eddie Sharp Racing.

Controversy
During the finale of the 2008 ARCA season, Speed and championship contender, Ricky Stenhouse Jr. were battling for position. Stenhouse hit the rear of Speed's car, sending him into the wall, effectively ending Speed's chances of a good finish, and possibly a championship. After visiting the pits for repairs, Speed's car was well off the pace and was lapped within two laps of the restart. As Stenhouse came by to lap Speed, Speed accelerated and slammed his car into Stenhouse, sending both cars into the wall. Neither driver was injured, however ARCA officials parked Speed for the day, which ended his chances for a championship.

NASCAR

2008

Speed made his NASCAR Craftsman Truck Series debut at Atlanta Motor Speedway on March 7, 2008, driving for Morgan-Dollar Motorsports No. 46 Chevy with Red Bull sponsorship. He recorded his first career Top 10 finish in NASCAR in just his second race when he finished tenth at Martinsville Speedway. On April 25, 2008, he won his first ARCA race at Kansas Speedway in just his fourth start. On April 26, 2008; Speed recorded a back-to-back top ten finish in the NASCAR Craftsman Truck Series at Kansas Speedway by finishing in eighth place in the No. 22 Red Bull Toyota for Bill Davis Racing, and won his first career race the following week at Dover. Two races after his first win, Speed scored another top-five at Michigan International Speedway. On July 18, 2008, Speed won his second ARCA race at Kentucky Speedway. On Sunday, October 19, 2008, Speed started his first NASCAR Cup Series event at Martinsville Speedway, finishing in 30th place. He finished the season in the No. 84 Team Red Bull Toyota Camry.

2009
For the 2009 Sprint Cup season, Speed's car was renumbered to No. 82. He was eligible to race in the 31st Annual Budweiser Shootout at Daytona International Speedway, as his car was one of the top six Toyotas in points. He began his quest for Rookie of the Year in 2009, and he won his first-ever Rookie of the Race honors at the Daytona 500. However, he collided with Kyle Busch early on and finished 40th.

After failing to qualify for Darlington and Sonoma, Speed competed in Joe Nemechek's No. 87 Toyota. He failed to qualify for the April Texas race.

2010
Red Bull Racing's No. 82 finished 36th in the 2009 owner's points standings, missing a guaranteed entry into the first five races of 2010 by one position. Speed successfully qualified for the 2010 Daytona 500. He led several laps late in the race after not going to the pits with about 19 laps to go. The next week at Auto Club Speedway, during a rain caution, Speed did not pit and ultimately ran out of gas. Speed was in the top 12 after the Food City 500 which guaranteed him a spot in the top 35. During the Michigan race in June, an incident occurred between Speed and his temporary teammate Casey Mears; when they were running 34th and 35th respectively, Mears collided with Speed and he spun out, causing a caution. Mears was replaced by Reed Sorenson for the remainder of the season. On November 26, 2010, Speed was released from his contract at Red Bull Racing to make room for the returning Brian Vickers who underwent heart surgery in June 2010; causing Speed to file a lawsuit against Red Bull accusing them of violating his contract. Speed's best finish with Red Bull Racing was fifth at Talladega in the 2009 Aaron's 499.

2011–13
Speed was without a ride for most of the 2011 season; he drove for Whitney Motorsports for several races at the end of the year. In 2012, he ran a limited schedule for Leavine Family Racing in the No. 95 Ford; it was announced in August that he would return to the team for 2013 to run the majority of the season.

Despite scoring Leavine's first top-ten finish at Talladega, Speed was released from the team after Atlanta in September.

IndyCar
Speed attempted to qualify for the 2011 Indianapolis 500 with Dragon Racing. However, he struggled to get the car up to speed and was replaced on the final day of qualifying by Patrick Carpentier, who promptly crashed the car in practice. Speed also turned down a chance to earn $5 million as part of a promotion at Las Vegas Motor Speedway for drivers not running the full IndyCar season to participate in the 2011 IZOD IndyCar World Championships. Just hours after the crash that claimed the life of Dan Wheldon, Speed said it was too dangerous for IndyCars to run on oval tracks.

Rallycross

Speed won a gold medal at the 2013 X Games in Foz do Iguaçu in his first ever rallycross race. He won a second gold medal at round 8 of the Global RallyCross Championship in Charlotte Motor Speedway.

Speed joined Andretti Autosport in 2014 to drive a factory-backed Volkswagen Polo and later a Volkswagen Beetle. He finished third in points with three wins. He won the Global RallyCross Championship in 2015, 2016, and 2017, collecting a total of ten wins. In 2018 he won the Americas Rallycross Championship (ARX), also with Volkswagen Andretti Rallycross, claiming two wins.

On November 1, 2018, Speed announced that he would be joining Subaru Rally Team USA for the 2019 Americas Rallycross Championship. In August 2019, he fractured his vertebrae in a crash at the Nitro World Games 2019, forcing him to miss the remainder of the ARX season. At the time of his injury, he was the points leader.

Speed returned with the Subaru factory team for the 2021 Nitro Rallycross Championship, where he was runner-up with one win and four podiums in five races.

Formula E
Speed competed for Andretti Autosport in the fifth race of the 2014–15 Formula E season in Miami. He raced alongside Jean-Éric Vergne, replacing Marco Andretti. On March 14, 2015, Speed qualified 11th and charged through the field to finish second behind race winner Nicolas Prost.

Racing record

Career summary

† Ineligible for championship points.
‡ Includes points scored by other drivers for A1 Team USA.

Single-seater racing

Complete GP2 Series results
(key) (Races in bold indicate pole position; races in italics indicate fastest lap)

Complete Formula One results
(key)

 Driver did not finish the Grand Prix but was classified as he completed over 90% of the race distance.

Complete A1 Grand Prix results
(key)

American open–wheel racing results
(key) (Races in bold indicate pole position) (Races in italics indicate fastest lap)

IndyCar

Complete Formula E results
(key) (Races in bold indicate pole position; races in italics indicate fastest lap)

NASCAR
(key) (Bold – Pole position awarded by qualifying time. Italics – Pole position earned by points standings or practice time. * – Most laps led.)

Sprint Cup Series

Daytona 500

Nationwide Series

Camping World Truck Series

 Season still in progress
 Ineligible for series points

ARCA Racing Series
(key) (Bold – Pole position awarded by qualifying time. Italics – Pole position earned by points standings or practice time. * – Most laps led.)

Rallycross
(key)

Complete Global Rallycross Championship results

Complete Americas Rallycross Championship results

Complete Nitro Rallycross results

Superstar Racing Experience
(key) * – Most laps led. 1 – Heat 1 winner. 2 – Heat 2 winner.

 Season still in progress

See also
 List of people diagnosed with ulcerative colitis

References

External links

 
 
 Profile and 2006 statistics

Living people
1983 births
People from Manteca, California
Racing drivers from California
NASCAR drivers
American Formula One drivers
Toro Rosso Formula One drivers
ARCA Menards Series drivers
GP2 Series drivers
British Formula Three Championship drivers
Asian Formula Renault Challenge drivers
Formula Renault Eurocup drivers
German Formula Renault 2.0 drivers
A1 Team USA drivers
Indy Pro 2000 Championship drivers
Formula E drivers
Global RallyCross Championship drivers
International Kart Federation drivers
Audi Sport TT Cup drivers
X Games athletes
ISport International drivers
Michael Waltrip Racing drivers
Andretti Autosport drivers
A1 Grand Prix drivers
IndyCar Series drivers
Alan Docking Racing drivers
Motopark Academy drivers
Dragon Racing drivers
David Price Racing drivers
Chip Ganassi Racing drivers